"You Time" is a song by American country music singer Scotty McCreery. It was released on September 23, 2020, as the lead single from his fifth studio album Same Truck, and released to country radio on October 12, 2020. The song was written by McCreery, Frank Rogers and Aaron Eshuis, who also produced together with Derek Wells.

Background
McCreery told CMT the inspiration was from his wife, Gabi, because their work lives were too busy, so he preferred to have her all to himself.

He shared: "When I wrote this song, I was on the road more than I'd ever been. I'd get home just in time to see Gabi heading off to work so I was really craving 'You Time' with her."

Release history
The song was released as a single digitally on September 23, 2020. It would later be released to country radio on October 12, 2020.

Music video
The music video was released on February 28, 2021, directed by Brianna Fish. It followed a newlywed couple from "Just Married" moment to and every love-filled moment, and inserted clips of McCreery and his band performing the song.

Charts

Weekly charts

Year-end charts

Certifications

References

2020 singles
2020 songs
Scotty McCreery songs
Songs written by Aaron Eshuis
Songs written by Scotty McCreery
Songs written by Frank Rogers (record producer)
Thirty Tigers singles